Bhagawatimai is a rural municipality located in Dailekh District of Karnali Province of Nepal.

The rural municipality is divided into total 7 wards.

The rural municipality was established on 10 March 2017, when Government of Nepal restricted all old administrative structure and announced 744 local level units (although the number increased to 753 later) as per the new constitution of Nepal 2015.

Pagnath, Rum, Moheltoli, Jagannath, Katti and Bada Bhairab Village development committees were incorporated to form this new rural municipality. The headquarters of the municipality is situated at Pagnath.

Demographics
At the time of the 2011 Nepal census, 99.9% of the population in Bhagawatimai Rural Municipality spoke Nepali as their first language, 0.1% spoke other languages.

In terms of ethnicity/caste, 42.4% were Chhetri, 26.6% Kami, 15.8% Thakuri, 7.8% Hill Brahmin, 4.3% Damai/Dholi, 2.1% Magar, 0.5% Sarki, 0.3% Badi and 0.1% others.

In terms of religion, 99.8% were Hindu and 0.2% Christian.

References

External links
 Website
 On Citypopulation.de

Populated places in Dailekh District
Rural municipalities in Karnali Province
Rural municipalities of Nepal established in 2017